Shalford may refer to:
Places in England
Shalford, Essex
Shalford, Somerset 
Shalford, Surrey

Other
HMS Shalford, a Ford class seaward defence boat of the Royal Navy

See also 
Scalford
Shelford (disambiguation)